Chaudhary Sarwan Kumar Himachal Pradesh Krishi Vishvavidyalaya, also known as CSK Himachal Pradesh Agricultural University (CSK HPKV), formerly Himachal Pradesh Krishi Vishvavidyalaya, is an agricultural university at Palampur in the Indian state of Himachal Pradesh. It was established on 1 November 1978 as an expansion of the existing College of Agriculture established in May 1966. Hill agriculture is the focus of this university. The university is accredited by the  Indian Council of Agricultural Research (ICAR).

Capital works investments for the university's land and facilities were provided by state government grants, and grants from the ICAR. In the 2004–05 academic year, approximately 63% of CSK HPKV's annual operating expenditure was funded by HP state government grants, and a further 29% covered by ICAR grants. The remaining funding came from fees collected and other sources.

None

Research and extension
In addition to the research activities in college departments, the university has five advanced research centres at the main campus in Palampur:
 Advance Centre for Hill Bio Resource & Biotechnology
 Organic Farming Research and Training Centre
 Centre for Commercial Mountain Agriculture and Enterprises Development
 Centre for Policy Research in Mountain Agriculture & Rural Development
 Centre for Human Resources Development in Mountain Agriculture

There are eight Krishi Vigyan Kendras (Agricultural Science Centres) at Bajaura, Dhaulakuan, Hamirpur, Kangra, Mandi, Una, Berthin and Kukumseri that conduct research and provide agricultural information to local farmers. In addition, there are five off-campus research and extension centres:
 Highland Agricultural Research & Extension Centre, Kukumseri
 Mountain Agricultural Research & Extension Centre, Sangla
 Hill Agricultural Research & Extension Centre, Bajaura
 Hill Agricultural Research & Extension Centre, Dhaulakuan
 Shivalik Agricultural Research & Extension Centre, Kangra

The university has released several varieties of cereals, pulses, vegetables, oilseeds, fodder and tea. It publishes several magazines and journals, both in English and Hindi. There is an Agricultural Technology Information Centre at the main entrance of the university.

References

Courses Offered
The university offers both undergraduate and post-graduate courses. In UG courses, Bsc(hons) agriculture, Btech in food technology, Bsc in physical and life sciences, Bsc(hons) community science and Bvsc in veterinary and animal sciences are offered here. And in PG courses, Msc in agriculture, Phd in agriculture, Mvsc in veterinary and animal sciences, Msc in food science and nutrition are offered here.

External links
Official website

Agricultural universities and colleges in India
Education in Kangra district
Universities and colleges in Himachal Pradesh
Agriculture in Himachal Pradesh
1978 establishments in Himachal Pradesh
Educational institutions established in 1978